Jebel Ali Racecourse (in Arabic مضمار جبل علي) is a racecourse for flat racing in Jebel Ali, Emirate of Dubai, situated 35 kilometers south-west the city of Dubai.

History
The racecourse was built in 1990 according to plans set down by Ahmed bin Rashid Al Maktoum and the trainer Dhruba Selvaratnam. The grandstand was expanded in 1995 and provides seating for more than 2000 spectators.

Description
The racecourse is a 2200 metres right-handed horseshoe-shaped dirt track with a 900 metres straight. A chute enables sprint races of up to 1400 metres to be run over a straight course. The course features a steep uphill finish. The track surface is composed of sand and oil. Jebel Ali Racecourse has been described as "cramped and appealingly frayed at the edges" with "a particularly carefree atmosphere".

Major races

Group 3

Listed races

References

Horse racing venues in the United Arab Emirates
Sports venues completed in 1990
Sports venues in Dubai
1990 establishments in the United Arab Emirates